This article contains the filmography of Alan Tam.

Films

References

Male actor filmographies
Hong Kong filmographies
British filmographies